30 Years to the Day is a 2007-released studio album by the American breakdancing and hip hop group Rock Steady Crew (as the group’s second studio album) and Brooklyn-based Mixtape DJ, remixer and hip-hop producer J.Period. The album is a 30-year commemorative  
compilation for the history of the group. It features various songs from old school artists such as Grandmaster Flash, Afrika Bambaataa, James Brown and Sugarhill Gang.

Track listing
 Crazy Legs Intro / Shaft in Africa
 J. Period Intro
 Scorpio
 Theme from S.W.A.T. / Zulu War Chant
 Heaven & Hell (Interlude)
 Rapper's Delight
 Funky Music Is the Thing
 Think
 Space Dust (Interlude)
 It Takes Two
 Apache
 Set It Off
 Know the Ledge
 Treat 'Em Right
 The Creator
 You Must Learn (J. Period Break Remix)
 Breaker's Revenge
 Looking for the Perfect Beat
 Planet Rock
 Cavern / White Lines
 Favorite Break (Interlude)
 Mambo #5
 Funky Nassau
 Rock Creek Park
 JS-1 Intro
 JS Scratch Intro / Love 'n' Affection
 Shifting Gears
 Son of Scorpio / Stone Fox Chase
 Theme from Planets / Pick Up the Pieces
 Action
 Catch a Groove
 Satin Soul
 I Like Funky Music
 It's My Thing
 Last Night Change It All
 Let's Get Small / Get Up & Dance
 Mardi Gras
 Miss B'Way
 I'm Gonna Get You
 Greedy G
 Back in Love Again
 Daisy Lady
 Theme from 2001
 The Champ / Warm It Up Kane
 Walk This Way / Art of Noise
 Another One Bites the Dust / Boogie Down BX
 Shack Up
 Jam on the Groove
 Hot Pants
 I Know You Got Soul
 Groove To Get Down
 I Can't Stop / Tramp
 Planetary Citizen
 Joyous
 Lovermaniacs (Sex) / Axel Foly Theme
 Soul Makossa / Din Da Da
 Runaway
 Let's Dance / You and Love Are the Same
 Once in a Lifetime
 Gotta Get Out of Here
 Favorite Break #2 (Interlude)
 It's Just Begun
 Keeping Rock Steady Alive
 DV-One Intro
 Rock Steady
 Bustin' Loose
 In E Gada Da Vida
 Aquarius
 Vitamin C
 Blow Your Whistle
 Blow Your Head
 Clear
 James Brown Tribute (Part 1
 James Brown Tribute (Part 2)
 James Brown Tribute (Part 3)
 James Brown Tribute (Part 4)
 James Brown Tribute (Part 5)
 James Brown Tribute (Part 6)
 Crazy Legs Outro
 Resurrection F. Mayda Del Valle (J. Period Remix)

References

2007 albums
Rock Steady Crew albums